James Lawton Collins (December 10, 1882 – June 30, 1963) was a major general of the U.S. Army who served in World War I and World War II, and was the father of Apollo 11 astronaut Maj. Gen. Michael Collins, USAF Reserve (ret.), and Brigadier General James Lawton Collins Jr. His brother, General J. Lawton Collins, served as Army Chief of Staff during the Korean War.

Biography

Family and early life

Collins was born into a large Irish Catholic family in Algiers, Louisiana, across the Mississippi River from New Orleans. His father, Jeremiah Bernard Collins, had left Dunmanway, County Cork in Ireland as a young boy in the early 1860s to join the rest of the family in Cincinnati, Ohio. Family legend has it he served as a drummer boy in the Civil War and, at age 16, helped to drive a herd of horses into Texas to replace the cavalry mounts which had been lost to the war. He made his way to New Orleans, where he worked for James Lawton, a grocer.

Jeremiah worked his way up to running the stables for the delivery wagons, and eventually married Kate Lawton, his employer's daughter. They moved across the river to Algiers, near the terminus and rail repair shops of the Southern Pacific Railroad, which employed many workers of Irish descent. There, they established a dry goods store, with a pub in the back. Jeremiah and Kate's eleven children would work there, serving beer and food to railroad men. Their first-born son was named for Kate's father, James Lawton Collins.

James was not tall, about 5 ft 6 in (168 cm), but he was agile, athletic, and good with horses. Later in life, he would come to the attention of Gen. John J. Pershing for his aggressive and successful polo playing, and as an excellent judge of horses. A letter in the Library of Congress in the Pershing correspondence asks James to go to the remount station in the Shenandoah Valley to pick a new horse for the general to ride.

He had told his son that his first flight occurred in 1911 in the Philippines, perched on the wing of a Wright plane, with Frank Lahm flying the machine. He said that they flew over a forest fire and the updraft nearly knocked him off the plane.

Military career

Collins enrolled in Tulane University, but his mother's uncle, the mayor of New Orleans, was asked by a local member of Congress if there was a bright young man who could "stay the course" at West Point. Collins, reached at Tulane, accepted the appointment.

During the Philippine–American War, Collins served in the 8th Cavalry and as an aide-de-camp to Pershing in the Philippines. He also served during the Mexican Punitive Expedition and in France during World War I. In World War I, Collins commanded a battalion of the 1st Infantry Division's 7th Field Artillery. For his service during the war he was awarded the Army Distinguished Service Medal, with the medal's citation stating:

Later he served as Defense Attaché to the Kingdom of Italy in Rome from 1928 to 1932.

During World War II he commanded the Puerto Rico Department and the 5th Service Command at Columbus, Ohio.

Collins retired as a major general in 1946. Upon his death he was buried at Arlington National Cemetery in Arlington, Virginia.

References

 
 
 The Biographical Dictionary of World War II Generals and Flag Officers – The U.S. Armed Forces, by R. Manning Ancell with Christine M. Miller, PhD, Greenwood Press, Westport, CT, 1996

External links
 Portrait of James L. Collins. 1933 from the United States Military Academy Library at West Point
 
Generals of World War II

1882 births
1963 deaths
United States Military Academy alumni
People from New Orleans
Military personnel from Louisiana
Burials at Arlington National Cemetery
American military personnel of the Philippine–American War
American people of Irish descent
Recipients of the Silver Star
Recipients of the Distinguished Service Medal (US Army)
United States military attachés
Michael Collins (astronaut)
United States Army personnel of World War I
United States Army generals of World War II
United States Army generals